The Regius Professor of History at the University of Oxford is a long-established professorial position. Holders of the title have often been medieval historians. The first appointment was made in 1724. The term "Regius" reflects the origins of the post as a royal appointment, itself a recognition of the important influence of history.

The Regius Professor of History is ex officio a Fellow of Oriel College. Professor Lyndal Roper has held the Regius Professorship since 2011, the first woman (and the first Australian) to have done so.

Past holders (complete)

1724–1736 – David Gregory 
1736–1742 – William Holmes 
1742–1768 – Joseph Spence 
1768–1771 – John Vivian 
1771–1801 – Thomas Nowell 
1801–1813 – Henry Beeke
1813–1841 – Edward Nares 
1841–1842 – Thomas Arnold 
1842–1848 – John Antony Cramer 
1848–1858 – Henry Halford Vaughan 
1858–1866 – Goldwin Smith 
1866–1884 – William Stubbs 
1884–1892 – Edward Augustus Freeman 
1892–1894 – James Anthony Froude 
1894–1904 – Frederick York Powell 
1904–1925 – Charles Harding Firth
1925–1928 – Henry William Carless Davis
1928–1947 – Maurice Powicke 
1947–1957 – Vivian Hunter Galbraith 
1957–1980 – Hugh Trevor-Roper 
1980–1989 – Michael Eliot Howard 
1990–1997 – John Huxtable Elliott 
1997–2011 – Robert John Weston Evans 
2011– – Lyndal Roper

See also
 Regius Professor of History (Cambridge)

References

History, Regius
History, Oxford
History, Regius, Oxford
Oriel College, Oxford
1724 establishments in England
Lists of people associated with the University of Oxford